The First Christian Church (originally known as the Tabernacle Church of Christ) in Columbus, Indiana, was built in 1942.  It was the first contemporary building in Columbus and one of the first churches in the United States to be built in a contemporary architectural style.

The building, designed by Finnish architect Eliel Saarinen, consists of a glass-fronted main hall, with a tower and bridge section.  Interior details such as light fixtures, screen and furniture were designed by Saarinen's son Eero Saarinen (who would later design the North Christian Church in Columbus) and Charles Eames.

The building was designated a National Historic Landmark by the National Park Service in 2001.

Plans for a new church
A larger church was needed to accommodate the growing needs of the congregation between World War I and World War II. Linnie I. Sweeney, the wife of Reverend Z. T. Sweeney, and her brother W. G. Irwin first discussed plans for a Gothic or Early American church, but her son and his nephew J. Irwin Miller, who had been following an architectural appreciation course at Yale University, proposed the idea for a Modern church instead. Designing and building the church became a two-generation family affair.

The family was introduced to Eliel Saarinen through the Reverend's daughter Nettie Sweeney Miller, who became chairwoman of the building committee. Saarinen had only built one church before, in Lithuania, and was apprehensive about the project until he heard the proposal for the building:

Saarinen, the son of a Lutheran pastor, was thrilled by the idea and agreed to design the building. He disliked overly indulgent and theatrical churches and believed Gothic and Georgian style churches were overdone and no longer relevant.

Design

Rather than imitating an historic style with no personal relevance to Columbus, Saarinen chose to reflect the fundamentals of Christian faith in the church design, in an effort to unite the different denominations in the town. He believed Modern architecture was particularly appropriate for this form of Christianity – the church would be based on the fundamentals of religion and architecture and freed from traditional theology and style.

Layout
The church is divided into four major features: the East Wing, containing the church proper, the chapel, and the auditorium; the West Wing, containing part of the Bible school; the connecting bridge between the East and West Wings, containing the rest of the Bible school; and the tower. The building is divided this way to create a balanced mass that is lively, yet restful.

Sunken terrace
The area between the East and West wings is set 8 feet below street level. The northern part of this sunken area contained a pool of 140 by 120 feet that was drained and filled in 1957 due to leaks. Today it contains a grassy area used for outdoor gatherings. The rest of the area forms a terrace that is bordered by the wings of the building on three sides and partially covered by the connecting bridge. The entire terrace is paved in a mosaic pattern and surrounded by plant and flowerbeds. Weather permitting, the area is used for church and Bible school activities.

Tower
The church tower was planned as a separate unit detached from the rest of the church, rising from the terrace level in an unbroken line of 166 feet. The base, measured at 17 by 23 feet, is located at the northeastern corner of the terrace pool.

The tower is designed in a simple, geometric form with plain brick walls that open into a perforated design at the top. The perforated section surrounds the sounding chamber from which the organ chimes are broadcast. The simple design of the tower gives it dignity and strength, and its separate placement in relation to the church proper provides balance to the building.

Church proper

The church proper, located on the northeastern corner of the property, is set on a platform reached from the street by a set of nine steps. The entrance leads to the narthex, to the right of which is a coatroom and to the left of which are stairs that lead to the gallery. Three doors connect the narthex to the church nave, one to the central aisle, the second to the side aisle, and the last to a low passage that connects the church with the Bible school.

The church proper was designed to create a serene, spatial atmosphere and thus has a unique asymmetrical design. Saarinen did not believe in forced symmetry because it created an artificial and sterile environment. Instead, he chose to focus on creating balance between various features and points of interest in the room. To this end, the cross at the end of the chancel is off center, but the communion table, integral to the service, is placed at the central axis of the church. Symmetry is used to accentuate the spirit of the service, instead of creating an artificial environment. Similarly, the middle aisle of the nave and the pulpit are slightly off center as well.

Unlike many traditional churches, there are no stained glass windows. Instead, Saarinen designed windows with the same pattern used in the perforated part of the tower, adding to the unity and natural symmetry of the building. The flow of light into the room was designed to highlight the serenity of the room. Daylight from the floor-to-ceiling windows light up the nave and chancel during morning services, adding to the spiritual nature of the service.

The church is 144 feet in length, 46 feet in width, and seats 580 people. With an additional rear gallery that holds 180 and a choir of 40, its total capacity is 800 individuals.

Chapel
The chapel, like the church, also features Saarinen's asymmetrical design. Instead of a central aisle, there is a wide aisle on the west side and a narrow aisle on the east. Similar floor to ceiling windows provide light here too.

Baptistry
The Baptistry is placed at the rear of the chancel, screened from the audience with swinging doors. It is lit with daylight from the windows in the church proper, and the light flows above those being baptized. The use of natural light to light the ceremony symbolizes the belief in the natural arrangements of death, burial, and resurrection. Facilities like dressing rooms, showers, and toilets for men and women are located on the second floor above.

Organ
The church organ was the latest model by the Aeolian-Skinner Organ Company at the time and consists of 4 manuals and pedals, 72 speaking stops, 4695 pipes, 61 harp bars, 25 chimes, and 73 other couplers and accessories. The size of pipes vary from 32 feet to ¾ of an inch long. It is housed in a chamber on the left of the chancel.

The organ was adapted to suit the needs of the church. It is based on an 18th-century organ with great tonal richness and clarity, but modern mechanical additions were made to make it easier to play. This resulted in an organ based on a classical foundation with enough flexibility to perform music of all periods.

Tapestry
The 35 by 11 ½ foot tapestry decorating the church was designed by Saarinen and woven by trained Scandinavian weavers under the direction of his wife, Loja Saarinen. Woven with wool and flax, it depicts the Sermon on the Mount in an image of animals and listeners. It was the largest tapestry in the country at the time.

Auditorium and reception room
The auditorium space is used for dinners, plays, and other entertainment involving a large number of people. The 500 seats can be stored under the stage to create an open space. Floor length windows open out into the terrace and pool for outdoor entertainment as well. The entire room is 92 feet long, 46 feet wide, and a little more than 12 feet high. The stage is 31 feet deep.

Connected to the auditorium is a reception room, used for a variety of activities and providing access to coat and toilet facilities. The room is 24 by 64 feet in size.

Kitchen and offices
The kitchen and pantry, an area of 900 square feet, is located on the East side of the East wing, arranged so that it does not interrupt church services and disturb the rest of the building. The office area adjacent to the East entrance hall consists of the Pastor's study, the secretary's office, a library, and a reception room.

References

External links 

Church website
Architecture page

Churches completed in 1942
Buildings and structures in Columbus, Indiana
Churches on the National Register of Historic Places in Indiana
Clock towers in Indiana
International style architecture in Indiana
Modernist architecture in Indiana
Churches in Bartholomew County, Indiana
National Historic Landmarks in Columbus, Indiana
National Register of Historic Places in Bartholomew County, Indiana
1942 establishments in Indiana